The Meath county football team represents Meath in men's Gaelic football and is governed by Meath GAA, the county board of the Gaelic Athletic Association. The team competes in the three major annual inter-county competitions; the All-Ireland Senior Football Championship, the Leinster Senior Football Championship and the National Football League.

Meath's home ground is Páirc Tailteann, Navan. The team's manager is Colm O'Rourke.

The team last won the Leinster Senior Championship in 2010, the All-Ireland Senior Championship in 1999 and the National League in 1994.

History

Pre-1960s
The first notable Meath team was the Pierce O'Mahony's club from Navan that represented the county in the All-Ireland final of 1895, in the days when the competition was played between the champion clubs from each county. O'Mahony's lost to Arravale Rovers of Tipperary by 0–4 to 0–3.

The county had to wait until 1939 for its next appearance at All-Ireland level, this time losing narrowly to Kerry by 2–5 to 2–3 in the final. In the intervening period, the county had achieved its first national success by winning the National League of 1933.

All-Ireland success finally came in 1949 when Meath beat Cavan in the final by 1–10 to 1–6. This first great Meath team achieved a second title in 1954, beating Kerry in the final, 1–13 to 1–7. In between these two successes, they appeared in two other finals, losing in 1951 and 1952 to Mayo and Cavan, respectively. They also lost out in the National League final of 1951 to Cavan.

During this period, their Leinster Championship rivalry with Louth became legendary: in the six provincial championships between 1948 and 1953 the sides met each year. The 1949 match went to three meetings, while those of 1950 and 1951 were replayed.

1960s and 1970s
Meath's team of the 1960s was characterised by a chronic inability to score until after half-time, but might have reached the 1964 All-Ireland final had a goal by Jack Quinn not been controversially disallowed in the semi-final. Meath were beaten in the 1966 All-Ireland final by a legendary Galway team that was winning its third All-Ireland title in a row.

After the 1966 final defeat, centre-back Bertie Cunningham declared that "next year, we will come back and win the All-Ireland". Sure enough, Terry Kearns secured the Sam Maguire Cup for Meath with a punched goal in the 1967 final to defeat Cork.

Meath won the National Football League in 1975 and looked a promising prospect for the All-Ireland. Defeat at the hands of Kevin Heffernan's Dublin team, however, was an indication of what was to come. Heffo's Dubs prevented Meath from winning provincial titles, before a talented Offaly team emerged to win more Leinster titles and become the only team capable of challenging the great Kerry team that dominated football between 1975 and 1986.

1980s: The Boylan Years
Meath looked far from All-Ireland Championship material when losing to Wexford in 1981 and Longford in 1982. By the time the 1983 Leinster began, Meath had appointed the hurling team's masseur, Sean Boylan, as football manager, and few could have predicted the success that would come to the county under his reign.

Boylan's initial appointment was greeted with scepticism as it had always been known that he was a capable hurler, but his role in football had been seen as merely repairing the players, not training them. Boylan's first task was to prepare Meath for an opening match against a Dublin team led by legendary midfielder Brian Mullins. The first match resulted in a draw, as a result of a fortunate ricochet shot from Barney Rock against new Meath half back Colm Coyle. The replay also ended with level scores, with Boylan gaining public support as a trainer of real substance. Dublin, however, went on to win the second replay in extra time, before going on to win the All-Ireland that year. Meath not yet being seen as Championship-winning material.

In 1984 the GAA initiated a one-off competition called the Centenary Cup, to celebrate the 100th anniversary of the GAA's foundation. Despite a concerted effort by the Kerry team (who had won four All-Irelands in a row from 1978 to 1981), the Centenary Cup final was ultimately played between Meath and Monaghan. Meath emerged victorious, and when Boylan was asked for comment, he replied that Meath intended to retain their title another hundred years later.

The 1980s team progressed cautiously towards victory. They missed full-back Mick Lyons for the 1984 Leinster final against Dublin and in 1985 slipped up against Laois in the semi-final. It was therefore not until 1986 that Meath won the first of three consecutive Leinster titles, and followed it up with All-Ireland victories over Cork in 1987 and 1988, the latter following a replay. Meath also secured the National Football League title in 1988. The Meath team of 1988 to this day, proves to be one of the most successful teams of all time. In this year, Boylan's men won the Leinster SFC, All-Ireland SFC, and the National Football League. In 1989 the champions were defeated by Dublin, while in 1990 Cork defeated Meath, completing a historic All-Ireland Hurling and Football double.
 
Meaths Leinster title win in 1986, was so significant. Dublin,the capital and Irelands most powerful and wealthiest and populated county had ten times the population of Meath. Dublin were kingpins of Leinster since 1974. Dublin had won 10 of the previous 12 leinster titles. Dublin were seen as almost unbeatable in leinster at the time. But Boylans Meath knocked Dublin from their perch. And not only did this, but went on to become the top football county in leinster and Ireland for the next 15 years, replacing kerry after 1987 as the number one county. Dublin are rarely beaten in the leinster championship and even less rarely beaten in leinster senior finals. Strong football counties like Westmeath and laois have never beaten Dublin in a leinster senior final. Kildare have beaten Dublin in one leinster senior final in the last 90 years since 1930. Sean Boylans Meath defeated Dublin in 7 leinster finals in 15 years. Meath defeated Dublin in the Leinster finals of 1986, 1987, 1988, 1990, 1996, 1999 and 2001.

1991 Championship
In 1991, the Leinster GAA Council decided to abandon the seeding system that had kept the previous year's finalists in opposite sides of the Leinster Championship draw. As a result, Meath and Dublin, having played the previous five Leinster finals, were drawn against each other in the preliminary round of the 1991 Leinster Championship. In the match Meath managed to catch up on a Dublin lead, and a long range shot from PJ Gillic bounced over the head of Dublin goalkeeper John O'Leary resulted in the first match ending in a draw, requiring the teams to meet again. Again the replay ended in a draw, and extra time was required, which failed to separate the teams, resulting in a third match.

The third meeting of the teams was expected to be close, but because the Dublin players were younger and more resourceful, as time went on Dublin were expected to gain the upper hand. The third game, though, again ended in a draw, even after extra time, and a fourth match was required. At this stage it seemed impossible for either team to overcome the other. In the fourth match - an unprecedented third replay, taking place on the same weekend that the Leinster final was originally meant to have been played - Dublin built up a strong lead, above what they had managed in the previous meetings. However the Meath players showed true doggedness, and an injury time goal from the unlikeliest of scorers - defender Kevin Foley - brought Meath level. The dynamics now favoured Meath and David Beggy managed to score a point directly from the restart to win the fourth match, bringing a remarkable saga to a final ending.

A tired Meath had finally qualified for the first round of the Leinster Championship, and played the next match against Wicklow, which also ended in a draw, before Meath emerged victorious in yet another replay. Meath then proceeded to beat Offaly in the semi-final, before overcoming Laois to win their hardest-fought Leinster title yet. Victory over Roscommon in the All-Ireland semi-final set up a meeting with Down in the All-Ireland final.

With each accumulated match, injuries were accumulating on the first fifteen players. Only three Meath players started the All-Ireland final in an injury-free status, hindering the team's game plan which required at least elven players in defined positions. Colm O'Rourke Meath's star player was incapable of playing a full seventy minutes. There were insufficient players for replacement but by now Meath had acquired an air of invincibility. However Down were the Ulster team with the best tradition in the Championship and represented serious contenders.

In the final itself, Meath fell far behind in the second half and had to stage yet another comeback. Colm O'Rourke appeared as a substitute with twenty minutes left to play as Meath trailed by eleven points. O'Rourke immediately started to help Meath accumulate scores, and entering injury time the gap was reduced to two, before Bernard Flynn came within inches of scoring what would have been a winning goal. The great Meath side had finally run out of time. Down won a historic Championship on a scoreline of 1–16 to 1-14.

The 1992 Championship started with a three-point home defeat to Laois which proved the final outing for many of the great side who then retired from inter-county football.

1994–1998: A New Era
Meath won a League title in 1994 with Robbie O'Malley of St. Colmcille's captaining the side to victory over Armagh. In the Championship, though, 1994 Meath were beaten by Dublin and the last of the team of 1986-94 retired.

A new team was formed for 1995. This team included many new stars like Trevor Giles and Graham Geraghty. However, these younger players were largely inexperienced for championship football and came up short against a Dublin team determined to win the Championship outright. The resultant 10-point drubbing left a strong impression on the younger Meath players of how much work was needed to win silverware.

In 1996 Meath were not expected to be successful and many were surprised to see the team reach another Leinster final against Dubiln. Leading 0–10 to 0–8 in the driving rain at the death, a ball was lobbed towards the Meath goal. Meath supporters were delighted to hear the referee blow his whistle for a free out for pushing by Dublin players as the ball was in the air. Meath were Leinster champions again. In beating a consistent Tyrone side in the semi-final, Sean Boylan managed to lead the same team that got nowhere in 1995 to an All-Ireland final in 1996. Meath came back from six points down to force a draw with Mayo in the 1996 All-Ireland Senior Football Championship final, forcing a replay. On 29 September 1996, with both sides having been reduced to 14 men following an infamous brawl early in the game, Meath again came from behind and defeated Mayo by 2–9 to 1–11 to claim their sixth All-Ireland. Captain Tommy Dowd, who was living in the Meath Gaeltacht, produced probably the longest victory speech ever given by a Leinster captain.

1997 saw Meath start the Championship against an ambitious Kildare team coached by the Kerry legend Mick O'Dwyer. Meath's previous record against Kildare had been excellent and Meath were expected to be sufficient to win despite Kildare's hunger and superior fitness. O'Dwyer's appointment created massive support in Kildare for their team though and ensured that the opening match had full attendance in Croke Park, with Kildare fans outnumbering Meath fans. This was a sign of the times as a few years earlier Meath were one of the best supported of any county but their supporters had become accustomed to success under Boylan and no longer travelled to big games in large numbers. The match saw Kildare emerge displaying an unexpected quality of football. Kildare led for most of the match with Meath only managing to draw level in the last minute as the Meath forwards found the Kildare defence very difficult to negotiate.

The replay finished level after ordinary time and extra time was now required to produce a winner. In extra time Kildare running on the never-ending engine of Willie McCreedy in midfield quickly created a six-point lead. It seemed as if Kildare's fitness had run Meath into the ground. Then Boylan produced a tactical masterstroke introducing substitute Jody Devine who scored six points in quick succession and helping Meath pull ahead by a single point before Kildare grabbed a freakish point to end the match in yet another draw. The sides therefore met again in a third match. This time the weather had changed and the match was played in rain. Again Meath's determination and bravery earned a strong victory; however as in 1991 this sequence of matches had resulted in accumulated injuries. Meath were without a meaningful defence in the Leinster Senior Football Championship Final against Offaly and the Offaly attack ran riot.

In 1998 Meath produced a performance against Offaly that was like the effect of an unwound spring. However Kildare had already managed to beat a transitional Dublin side and were now playing again at a very high level of fitness and determination. The 1998 Leinster Final between Meath and Kildare was a bad-tempered affair with Meath's Brendan Reilly sent off for a dangerous foul on Kildare centre-back Declan Kerrigan. Kildare's fitness began to cause Meath more problems as the Lilywhites again attacked in waves. This time Kildare had learnt the lessons of the previous year and produced greater more well-taken scores. In contrast reduced to 14 players and playing a team with superior fitness Meath were collapsing under the physical strain of the match. Kildare held onto their lead and a last attack by Meath ended in a questionable refereeing decision which resulted in Kildare moving the ball swiftly downfield. This presented an opportunity for Kildare to expose gaps in the Meath defence due to Kildare's numerical superiority and the resulting goal firmly clinched the match for Kildare.

1999
In 1999 Meath introduced new players to replace a team that had now lost the inspirational Tommy Dowd and to introduce some badly needed pace in an attempt to compete with the increasing fitness levels of other counties. As in 1996 Meath were expected to end their season early and empty-handed. Meath won the 1999 Leinster Championship with emphatic wins over Wicklow (2-10 to 0–6), Offaly (1-13 to 0–9), and their great rivals Dublin (1-14 to 0-12).

Meath now found themselves in an All-Ireland semi-final with Armagh. Armagh played all the best football in the first half with two incisive moves that opened up the Meath defence and resulted in goals for the outstanding Diarmud Marsden and half-back Hughes. However, in the second half, the Meath defence kept a much tighter rein on the Armagh forwards, and when Armagh's full-back Ger Reid, who had muted the attacking presence of Graham Geraghty, was sent off persistent fouling, Meath took control. Meath's right half forward, Evan Kelly, in particular shone in the second half with three fine points from play, to assist the Royal's in running out comfortable winners by 0–15 to 2–5. Meath had now reached another All-Ireland final against their rivals of decade previously, Cork. Captained by the nineteen-year-old right corner forward and free-taker, Philip Clifford, Cork had hammered Kerry in the Munster final by a 2–10 to 2-04 scoreline, and despite starting poorly against Connaught champions Mayo, they went on to run out easy winners by a 2–12 to 0-12 scoreline in the All-Ireland semi-final.

In the final Meath and Cork exchanged some early scores with Meath maintaining their lead through to half time (1-5 to 0–5) thanks to an Ollie Murphy goal midway through the first half. However, the second half opened with Trevor Giles missing an early penalty which would have put six points between the sides. Buoyed by this twist of fate Cork carried the ball downfield from Giles' penalty rebound to score a point and bring their deficit to two points. Two minutes later, Croke Park witnessed one of the greatest individual goals ever scored on All-Ireland football final day, when Cork centre-half-forward, Joe Kavanagh, winning the ball on the Meath forty, went on a solo run, beating three Meath defenders, giving and taking a return pass, before crashing a twenty-yard shot past the diving Cormac O'Sullivan into the roof of the Meath net. Now behind for the first time at 1–6 to 1–5, having briefly glimpsed a six-point lead only five minutes before, Meath's resolve was put to the test. However, from here on Meath took a firm grip on the game, and with superb performances from Graham Geraghty (who eclipsed Cork full-back Seán Óg Ó hAilpín in scoring three fine points from play) Trevor Giles, and John McDermott, Meath regrouped to outscore Cork by 0–6 to 0–2 in the final quarter, and win their seventh All-Ireland on a scoreline of 1–11 to 1–8.

2001
Meath played the opening match of the 2001 championship against Westmeath ending in a last-gasp one-point victory for Meath. Meath went on to beat Kildare convincingly in the next round by 1–16 to 0-11, before taking on and beating Dublin by 2–11 to 0–14 in the Leinster final. 2001 being the inaugural year of the revised All-Ireland Qualifier system, however, meant that Meath met Westmeath again in the new All-Ireland Quarterfinals. This time it was expected that Meath would win, and again Meath had a psychological edge having never lost a Championship match to Westmeath. However, Westmeath showed great tactical awareness, superior fitness, and great eagerness to play fast open football and for much of the game this caused much dismay to the Meath defence which at club level was more prepared for direct football and man-for-man marking. Aided by some poor Meath defending and a somewhat fortuitous goal, Westmeath were on the brink of a three-point victory when in the dying moments of injury time Ollie Murphy got the ball in a melee of players at the Canal End goal and from fifteen metres out unleashed a rasping shot into the top right hand corner of the Westmeath net. The strangest thing of all was that Murphy did not look at where he was kicking the ball - he literally shot based on where he assumed there was a vacant position in the goal. Having gotten out of jail, Meath performed somewhat truer to form in the third meeting of these two teams and ran out relatively comfortable four point victors in the replay.

Meath now faced Kerry in the All-Ireland semi-final of 2001. Given Kerry's great experience and tradition, and the fact that Meath were in the habit of cutting things a bit fine, it was expected that Kerry would win. Furthermore, Kerry's team featured the legendary Maurice Fitzgerald, certainly one of the greatest footballers of his generation. Kerry were managed by defensive legend Páidí Ó Sé and had a number of All-Ireland winners from 2000 available. Three superbly taken first half points from Ollie Murphy - who had given Kerry's Michael McCarthy a torrid time - and a well-taken goal by John McDermott helped Meath to at half-time lead of 1–6 to 0–4. However, what transpired in the second half was a collapse of unimaginable proportions by Kerry, during which Meath out-scored Kerry by 1–8 to 0–1, with the final scoreline of 2–14 to 0–5. Meath were so dominant in the ten minutes after half time that they went on a point scoring spree that meant the game was over with 20 minutes or so remaining, and the match was memorable for the unprecedented sight of Kerry fans leaving in their droves long before the full-time whistle. Meath's opponents in the final, Galway, had beaten a Derry team that had shown insufficient fitness and eagerness to reach an All-Ireland final.

Meath went into the All-Ireland final as overwhelming favourites. The scores were tied at 0-7 each at half time in what was a careful and cautious match, as Darren Fay held Galway's star full-forward Pádraic Joyce scoreless. Joyce was switched to corner forward at half time and Galway quickly built up an early lead in the Second half. Meath centre-half back Nigel Nestor was sent off for a second bookable offence - a foul on Jarlath Fallon - before star Meath forward Ollie Murphy, who was the most effective Meath forward that day, sustained a broken hand after being trod upon. These changes to the balance between the teams gave Galway an edge on the field that they had already been preparing in their own inner resolve. Just as the match seemed to be slipping away from Meath, though, John McDermott raised another attack on the Galway defence that resulted in a penalty awarded to Meath. Trevor Giles, Meath's captain and free-taker, was allocated the responsibility for this task as part of his team role. His shot, however, drifted agonisingly wide, and with it went Meath's chances of getting back into the game. From there, the outstanding Padraig Joyce continued to bedevil the Meath defence - eclipsing Mark O'Reilly in doing so - the Meath management all to belatedly sought to rectify the problem by putting Darren Fay back on Joyce, and Galway ran out emphatic victors on a 0–17 to 0-8 scoreline.

2002–2005: Boylan's latter years
The Championship seasons since 2002 have seen the re-emergence of a resurgent Dublin team and an extremely capable Laois team who won leinster in 2003 and Westmeath in 2004. After 2001 Seán Boylan's great team broke up, and in 2002, 2003 and 2004, many great players retired and left the team. Boylan, who was in charge of the Meath team since 1983, left the job 22 years later in 2005. Meath under Boylan became the top football county in Ireland between 1986 and 2001. In that period 86 to 01, Meath won four All-Ireland titles, reached 7 All-Ireland finals, won 8 leinster titles and 3 National League Division 1 titles with two different teams.

In 2005 Seán Boylan announced that he would not be seeking re-appointment as Meath manager. Boylan's 22-year term represents a record in modern GAA. In this spell he managed to lead two entirely different teams to win four All-Ireland titles, while coming very close to winning another two. He introduced an increased tactical awareness to the game. He built two All-Ireland winning teams, other great managers like Dwyer, Harte, McGuinness, McGrath, Gavin built only one. Unlike Dwyer, Harte, Galvin, who had huge underage success to build a team upon. With the 1987 and 1988 Meath team, Boylan had no underage success build on. In the history of game it is rare to win an All-Ireland with no underage success. His 1996 team came from nowhere to win an All-Ireland. Since 1950 the only other times this has happened is Down 1960, Dublin 1974, Kerry 1975, Down 1991, Galway 1998 and Meath in 1996. And what was so unique about 1996 also was Seán Boylan's 1996 team is one of the youngest teams ever to win All-Ireland, with seven under-21 Meath players playing in the final. This has only happened once before when Kerry won the All-Ireland in 1975 with lots of under-21 players. Kerry 1975 and Meath 1996 are the two youngest teams to win an All-Ireland. What made 1996 even more unique, with being one of the youngest teams ever to win, was Meath were six pints down with eleven mins to go, and drew the game. And Meath were six pints down in the replay and won the match. It is unheard of for a team to be six pints down in an All-Ireland final with ten minutes to go and not lose.  Meath won the All-Ireland from nowhere in 1996, with seven under-21 players. A young team that was six pints down in both games and still did not lose. While Mayo (Meath's opposition in 1996) tried to steal the narrative with talk of one of their players being sent off. Only Horan won an All Star for Mayo. Meath had six All Star forwards who played in that final, such as four-time All Star winner Tommy Dowd (who won All Stars in 1994, 1995, and 1996), Evan Kelly (who won an All Star in 2001), Graham Geraghty, Ollie Murphy (another forward who played in the 1996 final, would become the best corner forward in Ireland between 1999 and 2001) and Trevor Giles (who, apart from Dublin's Brian Fenton is the only ever two-time Footballer of the Year), Brendan Reilly (another All Star forward in 1996, who scored five pints in the semi-final in 1996 from play, four pints in the drawn game and one pint in the replay). Dublin's Dean Rock or Stephen Cluxton's All-Ireland winning pints were from frees. Steve McDonnell's All-Ireland winning pint in 2002 was in the 62nd minute in front of the goals. Reilly's pint was in the 70th minute and from a difficult angle, surrounded by Mayo defenders. That is why Meath scored six unanswered pints in the last ten minutes in the drawn game and Mayo scored none. And Meath in the replay scored 1-3 to Mayo's 0–2 in the last 15 minutes of the drawn game. Meath also had the best full-back in Ireland at the time Darren Fay, while the best midfielder in Ireland at the time was Meath's John McDermott. Meath also had one of the greatest defenders ever to play the game, a player thought of as the greatest left half-back ever, that was Martin O Connell. And Meath had two Footballers of the Year on their team, they were Trevor Giles and Martin O'Connell. Mayo had no Footballers of the Year on their team. Meath reached All-Ireland finals in 1996, 1999 and 2001, winning two. Mayo reached All-Ireland finals in 1996 and 1997, winning none.

2006–2009
Boylan was replaced by Eamon Barry of Dunshaughlin, who had previously contested the position of manager against Boylan on an almost annual basis. His appointment, though, did not result in an improvement in fortunes, despite Barry's experience in managing his Dunshaughlin club to win two consecutive Leinster Senior Club Football Championships. After just one season, Barry was deposed and replaced with Colm Coyle, a three-time All-Ireland winner and former selector under Sean Boylan. Coyle had previously managed the Monaghan county side - winning his very first match against then All-Ireland champions Armagh - and so there was renewed hope in the team.

The 2007 season began with a Croke Park sell-out against old foes and reigning two-time Leinster champions Dublin. Inspired by Graham Geraghty, Mark Ward, captain Anthony Moyles and Caoimhin King, Meath snatched an unlikely draw, raising hopes and interest in the county. A narrow defeat in the replay set the foundations for what turned out to be a relatively successful season with strong "back-door" victories setting up a quarter-final meeting with a much-fancied Tyrone side which Meath won with an excellent display. Meath met Cork in the semi-final while Kerry and Dublin renewed old rivalries in the other, raising the prospects of a number of mouthwatering potential All-Ireland final fixtures. Meath, though, did not become part of them, with a disappointing display against Cork meaning a semi-final would be the culmination of their season. Cork went on to lose heavily to Kerry in the All-Ireland final.

Meath's 2008 season began with a strong win over unfancied Carlow before a quarter-final fixture with a resurgent Wexford team saw Meath lose a 10-point lead at the interval and fall behind in injury time. While Wexford went on to meet Dublin in the Leinster final, Meath suffered a heavy defeat to Limerick in the 1st round of the All-Ireland qualifier series and Colm Coyle resigned as manager.
On 10 November 2008 Eamonn O'Brien was confirmed to be the new Meath boss after the meeting of Meath County Board.

The 2009 season began with the side facing old rivals Dublin which was a very poor performance from both sides, But despite all that Meath lost the match, but had a good run through the qualifiers meeting Waterford, Westmeath, Roscommon
and then meeting Limerick for the second time in the championship which others expected it to be like last year. But Meath got the best start with a goal from Cian Ward. But Limerick did perform well just before full-time two goals from Seannie Buckley and 2nd from sub Jim O'Donovan sealed the game to one point but was all too late for Limerick as Meath went on to meet their 1996 All Ireland finalists Mayo. Mayo and Meath met at Croke Park on 9 August in the quarter finals, a game which Meath won by 2–15 to 1–15 in a very close fought game until Meath came good in the second half. They went on to meet Kerry in the All-Ireland semi final on 30 August.

This match was played in poor and slippery conditions with both sides making errors. An early penalty awarded for a foul on Colm Cooper, was scored by Kerry captain Darren Sullivan. Kerry pulled away in the next 20 minutes. However Meath fought back bravely to bring the sides close at half time. Jack O'Conner introduced Tommy Walsh after the break who scored 1–2 in quick succession. As Kerry went 8 points up the game was over despite a late rally from Meath who lost by 4 in the end.

2010
The 2010 season began with the side beating Offaly despite poor performance before reaching the quarter-final to face Laois in a very rain soaked Croke Park which was dragged to extra-time but ended up in a replay the week after. Meath won well before sending old rivals Dublin for the first time since 2001 to reach the Leinster final. This was played on 11 July 2010, against neighbouring Louth. Meath won the match but both the way the match ended and the violent reaction of some Louth supporters led to controversy.

Deep into injury time in the 74th minute of the match, a goal was awarded to Meath by the referee after brief consultation with only one of the match umpires. Television coverage of the game proved that the ball was carried over the line by Meath player Joe Sherdian. Prior to the goal being awarded Meath had trailed by 1 point and with the referee blowing his whistle shortly afterwards this proved to be the decisive score.

Irate Louth fans stormed the pitch and commenced a process of chasing and physically assaulting the referee, who had to be led away by a Garda escort in scenes broadcast to a live television audience. Other scenes of violence saw bottles being hurled from a stand, one striking a steward who fell to the ground and Meath substitute Mark Ward was hit by a Louth fan. The situation led to much media debate in the days that followed, the violence was condemned and there were many calls for the game to be replayed in the national Media (including former Meath players Trevor Giles and Bernard Flynn.). GAA President Christy Cooney said the events were a "watershed" and one where the "circumstances were bizarre. I have never seen circumstances like it as long as I have been a member of this Association". He promised life bans for those who assaulted the referee.

The day after the match the GAA released a statement confirming that Sludden admitted he had made an error. The GAA also stated that the rules left it powerless to offer a replay and that this would be decided by Meath, Following a Meath County Board meeting it emerged that in his match report that the referee had originally blown for a penalty for Meath but when the ball ended in the net decided to award the goal. The county board decided not to offer of a replay and that that would be "the end of the matter".

Meath were drawn in The All-Ireland Quarter-final to face Kildare which was an excellent first-half performance but were later denied as Kildare won 2–17 to 1-12.

In September 2010, speculations begun whether or not Eamonn O'Brien would continue as manager for 2011. On 7 September 2010 O'Brien was surprisingly axed as manager after the club's board voted him out.

On 10 November 2010, former Monaghan manager Séamus McEnaney was confirmed as the new Meath manager. His appointment as manager meant that for the first time a non-native of Meath took charge of the team.

2011–present
The 2011 season began with the side meeting Kildare in a repeat of the 2010 Quarter Final. In a poor game, marred by a high number of wides from both teams, Kildare emerged victorious by 0–16 to 0-10 which meant Meath entered the qualifiers. Meath defeated Louth by 9 points (5-08 - 2-08) in Round 1 of the Qualifiers in Breffni Park, Cavan. A single-point victory over Galway in Round 2 set up another mouth-watering tie against Kildare in Round 3. However, this was to be the end of the road for Meath in the 2011 championship as Kildare again came out on top, this time by a scoreline of 2–11 to 0-14.

The 2012 season began as a disaster during the league as Meath were hit by relegation to Division 3 despite a good start, losing to Louth at home. Soon afterwards pressure mounted on McEnaney's continued position as Meath manager. Despite many voting to axe him survived the vote after clubs opted for him to stay. The championship started with the Royals facing Wicklow on 27 May 2012 at a very sunny and hot Dr. Cullen Park with Wicklow getting the better start racing into a 0–05 to 0-00 after 14 minutes. However, despite many expecting Wicklow to get the better of the game, Meath rallied back and outscored the Garden County 0–16 to 0-11. Up next was the meeting of Meath and Carlow. The game proved to be a real scare as Carlow took the lead just before half-time, but as Meath were on their way to winning the game, JJ Smith of Carlow hit a late goal to force a replay. The replay proved to be much better from the Royal County with an eventual result of 2–21 to 1–09 to advance to the Leinster Semi-final to face neighbours Kildare. The game saw Meath advance to the Leinster Final to face old rivals Dublin for the first time since 2001. The game saw the Liffeysiders getting the better start before Meath got the game level. The game eventually ended with Dublin just scraping past on a result 2–11 to 1-11. Meath faced Leinster rivals Laois in a very rain soaked O'Connor Park with Laois getting the better of Meath and the game ended with the Midlanders running out winners 1–15 to 1-12. McEnaney subsequently resigned as Meath boss. In October 2012, Mick O'Dowd was confirmed as the new Meath manager.

2013 season saw a marked improvement during the latter part of the league despite making a poor start and The Roayls earned promotion back to Division 2 despite losing to Monaghan in the final. The championship started with a repeat of the previous year Meath facing Wicklow this time at a very wet and windy Aughrim with The Royals running out winners by 5 points scoreline 1–17 to 1-12. Next game up was a meeting of Wexford in Croke Park, The game proved to be quite a tense first half battle before Meath claimed victory 0–18 to 0–13 to advance to the Leinster Final against old rivals Dublin. The Leinster Final was played in a very sunny scorched Croke Park on July 14m, The game was quite a battle but it was Dublin claimed the Leinster title once again on a scoreline 2–15 to 0-14. Meath entered the fourth round of the Qualifiers against Ulster rivals Tyrone. The game proved to be quite a tense display from Meath despite netting two goals from Mickey Newman and Eamonn Wallace with Tyrone eventually ending Meath's 2013 championship campaign on a scoreline 0–17 to 2-09.

The 2014 season started very mixed during the league without The Royal County missing out promotion. The championship started with a game against Carlow a repeat of the 2012 Quarter Final, But the game proved to be a real one sided display with the scoreline ending Meath 7–13 to Carlow 0-06. Meath played Kildare in the Semi Final without Meath getting the good start leading well at half time but ended up just hanging on at the end on a scoreline 2–17 to 0–16 to advance to their 3rd Leinster Final in a row. The Leinster Final took place on 20 July, The game however proved to be a dreadful display for Meath eventually being humiliated by Dublin 3–20 to 1-10.
Meath entered the fourth round of the Qualifiers against '2002 All Ireland Champions' Armagh at a rain-soaked Croke Park which showed little improvement from the Royal County, during which they trailed 0–8 to 0-2 after 8 minutes but managed to claw their way back and were behind 0–8 to 0–7 at half time. The second half saw both teams struggle to finds range due to difficult conditions. Eventually Armagh ended Meath's 2014 Football Championship campaign with the scoreline 0–18 to 0-13.

The 2015 season saw Meath have quite a good season despite falling short of Galway, Roscommon and Laois. The Royals got some decent results against Kildare, Down, Westmeath and scraped past Cavan only to miss out once again on promotion to Division 1.
The Leinster Championship proved to be a different story which saw them scraping past Wicklow in the Leinster Quarter Final at a very Sun scorched Páirc Tailteann in Navan winning 2–19 to 3–12 to set up a Semi Final clash with Westmeath. The Leinster Semi Final against Westmeath seemed like Meath were going to cruise to the Leinster Final easily with The Royals leading by 8 points at half-time 2–12 to 1-07. The 2nd half however proved to be a real surprise as Black cards were dished to both Donnacha Tobin and Graham Reilly before The Lake County took control hitting 2-08 without reply defeating their neighbours for the first time ever meeting in a championship game with Meath ending with 14 men after goalkeeper Paddy O'Rourke was shown a straight red card for knocking Kieran Martin to the ground. The game finished Westmeath winning 3–19 to 2-18 sending The Royal County to the qualifiers.
Meath faced Tyrone in Round 2B of the qualifiers in a very rain soaked Healy Park, Omagh with the game sometimes described as being quite dour with Tyrone playing real defensive style however despite that Meath led 0–04 to 0–03 at half-time only for 'The Royals' to lose by a two points during the second half thanks to a Peter Harte penalty 1–10 to 0-11 the final score ending Meath's 2015 Championship on a disappointing note. It was announced that Mick O'Dowd would continue as the Meath Senior Manager for a further 2 years with a review after the 2016 season

One commonly reported suggestion for the decline in Meath football was the advent of the Celtic Tiger, held to have softened the players the county produced.

The disappointing season of 2016 proved to be fatal in terms of O'Dowd's managerial career. Failure to land promotion to Division 1 in the league yet again, resulted in huge pressure on O'Dowd and his players to have a successful championship in the summer of 2016. Meath survived a tough test in Parnell Park by beating Louth on a score-line of 0–20 to 1-13. This set up a Leinster semi-final date with old rivals Dublin in Croke Park. A much-fancied Dublin team sent O'Dowd's men into the Qualifiers for the sixth year in-a-row. Meath were drawn away to Derry. Derry sent Meath out of the championship after winning on a score-line of 1–14 to 1–11 in a thrilling contest. O'Dowd called time on his inter-county management career as a result of this defeat.

Andy McEntee came then.

He left after Meath exited the 2022 All-Ireland Senior Football Championship.

Current panel

INJ Player has had an injury which has affected recent involvement with the county team.
RET Player has since retired from the county team.
WD Player has since withdrawn from the county team due to a non-injury issue.

Current management team
Manager: Colm O'Rourke
Selectors: ?
Coach: Paul Garrigan
Strength and conditioning coach: Eugene Eivers
Goalkeeping coach: Shane Supple
Shortly after being appointed manager, O'Rourke wrote that the team's former manager Seán Boylan (who won four All-Ireland SFC titles during the 1980s and 1990s) "will have open access to the team as adviser, counsellor, motivator or whatever else he wants to be".

Notable managers
Fr. Packie Tully
Seán Boylan
Colm Coyle
Eamonn Barry
Eamonn O'Brien
Séamus McEnaney
Andy McEntee
Colm O'Rourke

Managerial history
All-Ireland Senior Football Championship results since 1975.

Players

Notable players

Records
Brian Stafford is the team's top scorer in National Football League history, finishing his career with 13–334 (373) in that competition.

Most appearances

Top scorers

All Stars

Competitive record
This is Meath's record in All-Ireland SFC finals. Bold denotes a year in which the team won the competition.

Honours

National
All-Ireland Senior Football Championship
 Winners (7): 1949, 1954, 1967, 1987, 1988, 1996, 1999
 Runners-up (9): 1895, 1939, 1951, 1952, 1966, 1970, 1990, 1991, 2001
National Football League
 Winners (7): 1932–33, 1945–46, 1950–51, 1974–75, 1987–88, 1989–90, 1993–94
 Runners-up (6): 1936–37, 1938–39, 1939–40, 1949–50, 1954–55, 1955–56, 1999–2000
All-Ireland Junior Football Championship
 Winners (5): 1947, 1952, 1962, 1988, 2003
All-Ireland Under-21 Football Championship
 Winners (1): 1993
 Runners-up (1): 1997
All-Ireland Minor Football Championship
 Winners (4): 1957, 1990, 1992, 2021
 Runners-up (4): 1977, 1993, 2002, 2012

Provincial
Leinster Senior Football Championship
 Winners (21): 1895, 1939, 1940, 1947, 1949, 1951, 1952, 1954, 1964, 1966, 1967, 1970, 1986, 1987, 1988, 1990, 1991, 1996, 1999, 2001, 2010
 Runners-up (22): 1894, 1896, 1911, 1923, 1930, 1950, 1955, 1973, 1974, 1976, 1977, 1984, 1989, 1994, 1995, 1997, 1998, 2012, 2013, 2014, 2019, 2020
O'Byrne Cup
 Winners (10): 1967, 1974, 1977, 1983, 1992, 2001, 2004, 2006, 2016, 2018
Leinster Junior Football Championship
 Winners (18): 1947, 1952, 1958, 1962, 1964, 1986, 1988, 1990, 1991, 1995, 1996, 1997, 1999, 2003, 2005, 2006, 2017, 2019
Leinster Under-21 Football Championship
 Winners (8): 1985, 1989, 1990, 1991, 1993, 1996, 1997, 2001
 Runners-up (5): 1971, 1987, 1994, 2000, 2014
Leinster Minor Football Championship
 Winners (13): 1957, 1972, 1977, 1980, 1985, 1990, 1992, 1993, 2006, 2008, 2018, 2020, 2021
 Runners-up (14): 1946, 1954, 1955, 1956, 1970, 1975, 1979, 1981, 1983, 1986, 1988, 2002, 2011, 2012

Other
Centenary Cup (once-off competition)
 Winners (1): 1984

References

 
County football teams